Reptilicant is an action film released in 2006 that stars Gary Daniels and Tina-Desiree Berg. The rest of the cast includes Desi Singh, Jason Johnson, Paul Darrigo and Darryl Phinnessee. Desi Singh also directed the film.

References

External links 
 Cannes Film Festival/market Product guide 
 
 Dread Central Review
 Trailer on YouTube

2006 films
2006 action films
American action films
2000s American films